Rafael "Pye" Cunanan Yabut (born April 26, 1953) is a Filipino engineer. He was as the acting secretary of Department of Public Works and Highways for a month and as Undersecretary for Unified Project Management Office Operations of DPWH from January 14, 2008, until his retirement last June 2016. He was also the alternate representative of the Secretary to the Toll Regulatory Board. He served as Acting Secretary under the Duterte administration from July 1, 2016, until Mark Villar assumed the post by end of July 2016.

Early life and education 
Yabut was born in Candaba in Pampanga province on April 26, 1953. His parents are Ernesto Yabut and Felipa Cunanan. He took up Bachelor of Science in Civil Engineering at Angeles University Foundation and graduated in 1976. He then took up Bachelor of Science in Sanitary engineering at Holy Angel University in Angeles, Pampanga where he graduated in 1983. He completed his master's degree in Public Administration at Angeles University Foundation in 1996.

Career 
Yabut started to work as laborer in DPWH office in Angeles, Pampanga in 1975 a year before his graduation from college. As district engineer of Pampanga First District Engineering Office, he used to supervised the "Operation Baklas Billboards" and cleared the national roads of Pampanga of illegal structures and obstructions. In 2003, he was appointed as Assistant Secretary of DPWH being the youngest among the executive committee. On January 14, 2008, he was appointed as DPWH undersecretary by then President Gloria Macapagal Arroyo. Yabut is known as the main official implementing the department's toll roads, including those projects under the Public-Private Partnership program. His last project was the Cavite–Laguna Expressway before retiring last June 2015 to care for his aging parents. By July 1, 2016, however, he was designated as the acting Secretary of Department of Public Works and Highways until Mark Villar assumes office by July 26 or 27.

References

1953 births
Living people
People from Pampanga
Duterte administration cabinet members
Secretaries of Public Works and Highways of the Philippines
Benigno Aquino III administration personnel
Arroyo administration personnel